Bridges is a surname. Notable people with the surname include:

Alan Bridges (1927–2013), English film and television director
Alexander Bridges, English footballer 
Angelica Bridges (born 1970), American actress, model and singer
Barry Bridges (born 1941), English footballer
Beau Bridges (born 1941), American actor
Bill Bridges (basketball) (1939–2015), American basketball player
Bles Bridges (1947–2000), South African singer
Calvin Bridges (1889–1938), American geneticist
Charles Scott Bridges (1903–1961), American businessman
Ludacris (born Christopher Brian Bridges in 1977) American rapper and actor
Curley Bridges (1934–2014), American blues, rock and roll, and R&B musician
Ebanie Bridges (born 1986), Australian professional boxer
Edward Bridges, 1st Baron Bridges (1892–1969), British civil servant and Cabinet Secretary
Elisa Bridges (1973–2002), American model and actress
Frank Bridges (1890–1970), American college sports coach
Frank M. Bridges (1834–1885), American politician
Garey Bridges (born 1969), British actor
George Bridges (disambiguation), multiple people
George Washington Bridges (1825–1873), American politician
George Wilson Bridges (1788–1863), writer, photographer and Anglican cleric
Harry Bridges (1901–1990), American labor leader
Hedley Francis Gregory Bridges (1902–1947), Canadian politician
Henry Bridges (disambiguation), multiple people
James Bridges (born 1936), American screenwriter, film director, producer, and actor
Jeff Bridges (born 1949), American actor
J'Nai Bridges, American operatic mezzo-soprano
John Bridges (disambiguation), multiple people
Jordan Bridges (born 1973), American actor
Lloyd Bridges (1913–1998), American actor
Leon Bridges (born 1989), American singer and songwriter
Lucas Bridges (1874–1949), Anglo-Argentine author and explorer
Marilyn Bridges (born 1948), American photographer
Mark Bridges (disambiguation), multiple people
Michael Bridges (born 1978), English footballer
Michelle Bridges (born 1970), Australian personal trainer, author & TV personality
Randy Bridges, American politician
Robert Bridges (1844–1930), English Poet Laureate
Robert Bridges (critic) (1858–1941), American editor and author
Rocky Bridges (1927–2015), American baseball player
Roy D. Bridges Jr. (born 1943), American astronaut
Ruby Bridges (born 1954), American activist
Rutt Bridges, American geophysicist and politician
Sheila Bridges, American interior designer 
Simon Bridges (born 1976), New Zealand politician
Steve Bridges (1963–2012), American comedian, impressionist and actor
Styles Bridges (1898–1961), American politician
Thomas Bridges (disambiguation), multiple people
Todd Bridges (born 1965), American actor
William Bridges (disambiguation), multiple people

Given name unknown
 Bridges (cricketer, born 1790s), English cricketer with Cambridge Town Club
 Bridges (cricketer, born 1780s), English cricketer with Homerton Cricket Club

See also
Bridge (surname)
Brydges

Surnames
English-language surnames
Scottish surnames
Surnames of English origin
Surnames of British Isles origin